Meron Benvenisti (21 April 193420 September 2020) was an Israeli political scientist who was deputy mayor of Jerusalem under Teddy Kollek from 1971 to 1978, during which he administered East Jerusalem and served as Jerusalem's chief planning officer. He supported a binational Israeli–Palestinian state.

Early life
Benvenisti was born in 1934 in Jerusalem, his father was David Benvenisti, a Greek Jew originally from Thessaloniki and recipient of the Israel Prize, while his mother Leah (née Friedman) was Lithuanian Jewish. He was the brother of Refael (Rafi) Benvenisti, and father of Eyal Benvenisti. He graduated from the Leyada and served his compulsory military service in a Nahal unit near the Israeli–Lebanese border at Kibbutz Gesher HaZiv. In the early 1950s, following his discharge, he moved to the nearby Kibbutz Rosh Hanikra and served as a youth movement leader. He enrolled at the Hebrew University after his return to Jerusalem in 1955, studying both economics and medieval history. He later published books and maps on the period of the Crusaders in the Holy Land. During his years as a student, he headed the Hebrew University student union and the National Union of Israeli Students. He later obtained a doctorate from Harvard University's Kennedy School for his work on conflict management in Jerusalem and in Belfast.

Career
In 1984 he founded the West Bank Database Project, documenting social, economic, and political developments in the West Bank. Since 1992 he devoted his time to teaching as visiting lecturer (at Ben-Gurion University in 1994–1998, and Johns Hopkins SAIS, Washington DC, in 1982–2009), research and writing on Jerusalem, the Northern Ireland conflict, Israeli–Palestinian relations, Palestinian vanished landscape, bi-nationalism and restaurant reviews. He was a fellow at the Wilson Center in Washington DC and a visiting fellow at Harvard's CFIA and a recipient of research grants from the Rockefeller Foundation, the Ford Foundation and the US institute of Peace. Between 1991 and 2009 he wrote a column for Haaretz, Israel's leading left-liberal newspaper. He held a doctorate from Harvard's Kennedy School.

Political views 
He was a critic of Israel's policies towards Palestinians in the West Bank and Gaza Strip and was an advocate of the idea of a binational state. In 2004, he warned that plans to build a separation wall were actually plans for "bantustans" that would effectively imprison millions of Palestinians and exacerbate the conflict, rather than resolve it as many hoped. He said that "The day will come when believers in this illusion will realise that 'separation' is a means to oppress and dominate, and then they will mobilise to dismantle the apartheid apparatus." In 2012, he suggested claims that Israel is an apartheid state were "wrongheaded, simplistic and dangerous", but also said the situation in Israel proper is "no less grave". He argued that Israel had become a "Herrenvolk democracy" (master race democracy) in which Israel behaves "like a full-blooded democracy" but has a group of serfs (the Arabs) for whom democracy is suspended, creating a situation of "extreme inequality". In the same interview, he stated that "The separation fence: that is truly apartheid. Separation is apartheid." According to Benvenisti, the only solution is to incorporate Palestinians into the state on conditions of equality.

His experience led him in later years to be disillusioned with Zionism, stating in an interview with Ari Shavit:

I went to Kibbutz Hanikra in the 1950s and experienced the transcendent feeling of working in the banana groves without noticing that in order to plant the banana trees, I was uprooting olive trees, thousands of years old, of a Palestinian village. During that whole period ... I did not understand the meaning of what I was doing. But when I started to deal with the Arabs of East Jerusalem, I began to understand. I saw that the problem is not only the individual rights of the Palestinians but also their collective rights.

According to Ian Lustick, Benvenisti will be remembered primarily as a prophet of a future One state solution:-
'he will be remembered primarily as a prophet — a tormented, hyperbolic, anguished, but, in the end, undeniably accurate prophet. Prophets only need to be right about some things to be remembered for their prophecy. Meron was right about one big thing: that the future of Palestine, the future of the Land of Israel, will grow out of a one-state reality from the river to the sea — a reality he identified as such earlier than almost any Jewish Israeli.'

Death 
On 20 September 2020, Benvenisti died of renal failure  at the age of 86.

Publications

Books (partial) 
 Benvenisti, Meron (1976). The Crusaders in the Holy Land. Jerusalem: Israel Universities Press. OCLC 1004860416
 Benvenisti, Meron (1976): Jerusalem, the Torn City, University of Minnesota Press, Minneapolis)
 Benvenisti, Meron (1984): West Bank Data Project: A Survey of Israel's Policies, American Enterprise Institute for Public Policy Research, 
 Benvenisti, Meron (1988): Conflicts and Contradictions, Villard, 
 Benvenisti, Meron (1995): Intimate Enemies: Jews and Arabs in a Shared Land. University of California Press 
 Benvenisti, Meron (1996): City of Stone: The Hidden History of Jerusalem. University of California Press 
 Benvenisti, Meron (2002): Sacred Landscape: Buried History of the Holy Land Since 1948. University of California Press. 
 Benvenisti, Meron (2007): Sons of the Cypresses: Memories, Reflections and Regrets from a Political Life. University of California Press 
 Benvenisti, Meron (2012), The Dream of the White Sabra  (Hebrew)

Articles (partial) 
 
 
  (about Sataf)
 
 
 
 
 
 
 
  (about Ikrit)
 
 
 
 
 
 
 
  (on the possible/probable de facto long-term political division between Gaza and the West Bank and its effects on both Israel and the Palestinians)

References 

1934 births
2020 deaths
Deputy Mayors of Jerusalem
Haaretz people
Historians of the Crusades
Israeli activists
Israeli columnists
Israeli expatriates in the United States
Israeli medievalists
Israeli people of Greek-Jewish descent
Israeli people of Lithuanian-Jewish descent
Israeli political scientists
Harvard Kennedy School alumni
Palestine ethnographers